Rasau Kerteh is a small settlement town in Terengganu, Malaysia. This settlement town is located near Bandar Ketengah Jaya.

Towns in Terengganu